#5 is Flow's fifth studio album. The album comes into two editions: regular and limited. The limited edition includes a bonus DVD. It reached #7 on the Oricon charts  and charted for 5 weeks.

Track listing

Bonus DVD Track listing

References

2009 albums
Flow (band) albums